Glencoe (foaled 1864) was a notable Australian bred Thoroughbred racehorse who won the 1868 Melbourne Cup and eight other principal races.

Pedigree
Glencoe was chestnut stallion by the imported Lord of the Hills (by Touchstone), his dam Queen of Clubs was by the colonial stallion, Cossack out of Queen of Hearts by Dover (GB). He descended from a now extinct colonial family, C33, which did not produce any other winners of note.

Racing record
Under the colours of his breeder/owner, Richard Dines, Glencoe won the 1867 AJC Sires' Produce Stakes and was then was sold to prominent horseman, "Honest" John Tait. 

In 1868 Glencoe won the AJC St Leger Stakes, VRC All-Aged Stakes and VRC Queens Plate. 
John Tait nominated three of his horses for the 1868 Melbourne Cup, the raging favourite The Barb, Bylong and Glencoe. He later scratched The Barb and backed Glencoe with Bylong drifting right out of the betting market. Glencoe defeated twenty-five other horses to win the Melbourne Cup comfortably and win a fortune for Tait.

Glencoe later became a temperamental racehorse and turned in some bad performances which led to Tait selling him to the Victorian,  J. Bailey.

Glencoe raced as a six-year-old, retiring as a winner of many of his country's most important races. At stud, he proved not to be successful.

References

 Glencoe at Thoroughbred Heritage.com

External links
 Thoroughbred Bloodlines
 Glencoe's pedigree and partial racing stats

1864 racehorse births
Melbourne Cup winners
Racehorses bred in Australia
Racehorses trained in Australia
Thoroughbred family C33